Awutu Senya District is a former district that was located in Central Region, Ghana. Originally it was formerly part of the then-larger Awutu/Effutu/Senya District on 29 February 2008. However on 28 June 2012, it was split out into two new districts: Awutu Senya West District (capital: Awutu Breku) and Awutu Senya East District (which was later elevated to municipal district assembly status on 15 March 2018; capital: Kasoa). The district assembly was located in the southeast part of Central Region and had Awutu Breku as its capital town.

List of settlements

Sources
 
 District: Awutu/Senya District

References

Central Region (Ghana)

Districts of the Central Region (Ghana)